Micro Machines V4 is a racing video game developed by Supersonic Software and published by Codemasters for Microsoft Windows, PlayStation 2, PlayStation Portable and Nintendo DS.

Gameplay
Players control a toy Micro Machines vehicle and to drive through a race track. As in most games, the objective is to beat the other racers to the finish line. However, as in other games in the Micro Machines video game series, there is an alternate way to victory as well; in racing, the "screen" is shared amongst all racers (opposed to split screen), and if a player can drives far enough ahead of the other racer(s) that they fall off out of the viewing area, they receive a point. If enough points are received or lost, the player will win or lose. Upon winning races, new vehicles to race as are earned, with a total of 750 to be collected. As the game entails driving toy cars, the races courses settings typically reflect that, with race courses being set up on billiard tables, around the edge of bathtubs, on furniture, or other household type settings including many rooms.

Along each of these racetracks, players pick up these orbs containing different power-ups that can heal yourself, or attack other players. These orbs could contain items including; Hammers, Health Pills, Tesla Chess Pieces, Plasma Cannons, Machine Guns, Peashooters and Mines among others. Weapons vary in damage but all roughy dealing one section of health each attack (apart from the pill which heals the player a full five bars of health). Once a player falls below five bars, they will lose a wheel, causing them to drive slower and have less grip. This keeps on occurring until 20 bars lost. From that point, no more damage can be inflicted onto the racer. A pill is not able to gain wheels back after they are lost. Once a round is over, all players will be set to max health and all lost wheels will be returned.

Apart from power-up orbs, a variety of other pick-ups can be found along the track. These include speed boost tiles, health tiles and equaliser tiles. Speed boosts tiles speed the player up for roughly a second before going back to their original speed. Health tiles will often be present in rows of four or five. Each health tile the player run over will regain them one bar of health. The equaliser tiles changes all racers health to that of the racer who activated it. However, even though the health is the same, players will not lose any wheels right away. Once a tile is activated, that tile may not be activated until the following round.

Reception

Micro Machines V4 received "mixed or average" reviews, according to review aggregator Metacritic Several review outlets noted that the game was competent, but that its poor graphics and shallow, unremarkable gameplay hindered the experience.

IGN gave the game a 7/10, stating that "Micro Machines V4 is definitely the strongest version to come along since the franchise debuted on the NES almost 20 years ago. A solidly-designed title aimed at young children and inexperienced gamers, V4 is a nice, entry-level piece of software that offers just enough challenge and variety for juveniles without the inevitable frustrations and complications found in most of today's racers". GameSpot gave the game a 5.5/10, while they praised the game to its number of cars to collect, they largely criticized the generic nature of the cars, the trial and error-based gameplay and poor camera view.

References

External links

Micro Machines (video game series)
2006 video games
Cancelled Xbox games
Codemasters games
Nintendo DS games
PlayStation 2 games
PlayStation Portable games
Video games scored by Allister Brimble
Windows games
Multiplayer and single-player video games
RenderWare games
Video games using Havok
Video games developed in the United Kingdom
Supersonic Software games